Aulocera is a genus in the subfamily Satyrinae (or brown butterflies) of the brush-footed butterfly family, Nymphalidae. Commonly referred to as banded satyrs, species of the genus Aulocera are endemic to the Himalayas and associated mountain ranges.

Taxonomy
Aulocera is considered to be a valid genus by some authorities and a junior subjective synonym of the basal genus Satyrus by others.

List of species
 Aulocera sybillina Oberthür, 1890
 Aulocera brahminus (Blanchard, 1853)
 Aulocera brahminoides (Moore, 1901)
 Aulocera magica Oberthür, 1886
 Aulocera merlina Oberthür, 1890
 Aulocera padma (Kollar, 1844)
 Aulocera loha (Doherty, 1886)
 Aulocera swaha (Kollar, 1844)
 Aulocera saraswati (Kollar, 1844)

General description

Banded satyrs are large powerfully built Himalayan butterflies which are dark brown above. They are characterised by a white band across both wings. The wings have chequered fringes. A dark apical spot or ocellus is present on the forewing. The under hindwing is dark. The under hindwing is beautifully variegated with brown, white and grey.

Males have an obscure brand on the forewing.

Habits
Banded satyrs inhabit the Himalayas from moderate to considerable high altitudes. Fond of open country, they can found elsewhere especially on rocks and paths. Banded satyrs are very fond of sunshine.

See also
Satyrinae
Nymphalidae
List of butterflies of India (Satyrinae)

References

 
 
 .

External links
Images representing Aulocera at Bold

 
Satyrini
Butterfly genera
Taxa named by Arthur Gardiner Butler